Mani (in Middle Persian: 𐭌𐭀𐭍𐭉/𐭬𐭠𐭭𐭩/𐮋𐮀𐮌𐮈/𐬨𐬁𐬥𐬌/𐫖𐫀𐫗𐫏 Māni, New Persian:  Māni, Chinese:  Móní, Syriac Mānī, Greek , Latin ; also , Latin , from Syriac  Mānī ḥayyā "Living Mani", –2 March AD 274 or 26 February AD 277) was an Iranian prophet and the founder of Manichaeism, a religion most prevalent in late antiquity. This religion is strongly influenced by Gnosticism, Christianity, Zoroastrianism, and Buddhism. It was once widespread, but is now confined to small areas of China, such as Fujian.

Mani was born in or near Seleucia-Ctesiphon (south of modern Baghdad) in Mesopotamia, at the time part of the Parthian Empire. Seven of his major works were written in Syriac, and the eighth, dedicated to the Sasanian emperor Shapur I, was written in Middle Persian. He died in Gundeshapur.

Etymology
The exact meaning of the name is a question still unsolved. It may have derived from Babylonian-Aramaic Mânâ [luminescence]. Mandaeans used the term mânâ rabba, which means "Enlightened Lord/King". Ancient Greek interpretations were skeuos (σκεῦος, vessel, instrument) and homilia (ὁμιλία, intercourse, company, communion, instruction).

The same slightly contemptuous "a certain" (Manes quidam) also appears in Hegemonius' Acta Archelai (4th century), however, Hegemonius contributes a detailed description of Mani's looks. Mani’s names became the object of uplifting transformation (Greek, Coptic Mannichaios, Latin Mannichaeus, i.e., Mannam fundens "pouring out Manna").

Sources
It is now designated Codex Manichaicus Coloniensis because it is conserved at the University of Cologne. Combining a hagiographic account of Mani's career and spiritual development with information about Mani's religious teachings, and containing fragments of his writings, it is now considered the most reliable source of information about the historical Mani.

All other medieval and pre-medieval accounts of his life are either legendary or hagiographical, such as the account in Fihrist by Ibn al-Nadim, purportedly by al-Biruni, or were anti-Manichaean polemics, such as the 4th-century Acta Archelai. Among these medieval accounts, Ibn al-Nadim's account of Mani's life and teachings is generally speaking the most reliable and exhaustive. Notably, the (in other accounts prominent) image of the "Third Ambassador" is only represented through a brief mention of the name bašīr, "messenger of good news", and the topos of "Mani the Painter" (which in other Islamic accounts almost completely replaces that of "the founder of a religion") is completely absent.

Life

This work and other evidence discovered in the 20th century establishes Mani as a historical individual.

Early life 
Mani was born near Seleucia-Ctesiphon, perhaps in the town Mardinu in the Babylonian district of Nahr Kutha; according to other accounts in the town Abrumya. Mani's father Pātik (Middle Persian Pattūg;), a native of Ecbatana (now Hamadan, Iran), was a member of the Jewish Christian sect of the Elcesaites. His mother was of Parthian descent (from "the Armenian Arsacid family of Kamsarakan"); her name is reported variously, among others Maryam.

Mani was raised in a heterodox environment in Babylon. The Elcesaite community was ostensibly Jewish Christian, though with some Gnostic features due to their Ebionite heritage, such as the belief in recurring incarnations of heavenly apostles, one of whom was a docetic Christ. At ages 12 and 24 Mani had visionary experiences of a "heavenly twin" of his (syzygos), calling him to leave his father's sect and preach the true message of Jesus in a new gospel.

Travelling to India 
Mani then travelled to India (Sakas in present day Afghanistan), where he studied Hinduism and its various extant philosophies, as well as Buddhism. Al-Biruni says Mani only traveled to India after being banished from Persia, but this might be an error or a second journey. It is believed that his Christian roots might have been influenced by Marcion and Bardaisan.

Return from India 
Returning in 242, Mani presented himself to Shapur I, to whom he dedicated his only work written in Persian, known as the Shabuhragan. Shapur was not converted to Manichaeism and remained Zoroastrian, but he favored Mani's teachings, which mixed Christianity, Buddhism and Zoroastrianism, and took him into his court. Mani is said to have performed miracles, including levitation, teleporting and healing, which helped him to gain converts in the Iranian elite. He was also famed as a painter.

Imprisonment and execution 
Shapur's successor Hormizd I, who reigned only for one year, continued to patronize Mani, but his successor Bahram I, a follower of the intolerant Zoroastrian reformer Kartir, began to persecute the Manichaeans. He incarcerated Mani, who died in prison within a month, in 274. According to sources, he passed his last days comforting his visiting disciples, teaching that his death would have no other consequence than the return of his soul to the realm of light.

Mani's followers depicted Mani's death as a crucifixion in a conscious analogy to the crucifixion of Jesus; al-Biruni says that Bahram ordered the execution of Mani. There is a story which claims that he was flayed, and his corpse suspended over the main gate of the great city of Gundeshapur; however, there is no historical basis for this account. It is more plausible that his body was mutilated via post-mortem decapitation, and his head put on display, which may be the original source of the embellishment.

Works
The canon of Mani includes six works originally written in Syriac, and one in Persian, the Shapuragan. While none of his books have survived in complete form, there are numerous fragments and quotations of them, including a long Syriac quotation from one of his works, as well as a large amount of material in Middle Persian, Coptic, and numerous other languages.

Examples of surviving portions of his works include: the Shabuhragan (Middle Persian), the Book of Giants (numerous fragments in many languages), the Fundamental Epistle (quoted in length by Saint Augustine), a number of fragments of his Living Gospel (or Great Gospel), a Syriac excerpt quoted by Theodore Bar Konai, and his Letter to Edessa contained in the  Cologne Mani-Codex. Mani also wrote the book Arzhang, a holy book of Manichaeism unique in that it contained many drawings and paintings to express and explain the Manichaeist creation and history of the world.

Teaching

Mani's teaching was intended to succeed and surpass the teachings of Christianity, Zoroastrianism, Buddhism, Hellenistic and Rabbinic Judaism, Gnostic movements, Ancient Greek religion, Babylonian and other Mesopotamian religions, and mystery cults. It is based on a rigid dualism of good and evil, locked in eternal struggle.

In his mid-twenties, Mani decided that salvation was possible through education, self-denial, fasting and chastity. According to Al-Biruni, a 10th-century Iranian scholar, Mani claimed to be the Paraclete promised in the New Testament, and the Last Prophet. However according to Lodewijk J. R. Ort, the term last prophet may "in all probability derived from the Quran by Al-Buruni in order to formulate Mani's pretensions and religious claims". Therefore Lodewijk J. R. Ort concludes that a definitive pronouncement about the final character of Mani's appearance is not mentioned in Manichaeistic scriptures.While his religion was not strictly a movement of Christian Gnosticism in the earlier mode, Mani did declare himself to be an "apostle of Jesus Christ", and extant Manichaean poetry frequently extols Jesus and his mother, Mary, with the highest reverence. Manichaean tradition also claims that Mani was the reincarnation of different religious figures including Jesus, Zoroaster, and the historical Buddha.

Mani's followers were organized in a church structure, divided into a class of "elects" (electi) and "auditors" (auditores). Only the electi are required to follow the laws strictly, while the auditores care for them, hoping to become electi in their turn after reincarnation.

Christian and Islamic tradition
Late Antique Christian accounts in the West
The Western Christian tradition of Mani is based on Socrates of Constantinople, a historian writing in the 5th century. According to this account, one Scythianos, a Saracen, husband of an Egyptian woman, "introduced the doctrine of Empedocles and Pythagoras into Christianity"; that he had a disciple, "Buddas, formerly named Terebinthus," who travelled in Persia, where he alleged that he had been born of a virgin, and afterwards wrote four books, one of Mysteries, a second The Gospel, a third The Treasure, and a fourth Heads. While performing some mystic rites, he was hurled down a precipice by a daimon, and killed.

A woman at whose house he lodged buried him, took over his property, and bought a boy of seven, named Cubricus. This boy she freed and educated, leaving him the property and books of Buddas-Terebinthus. Cubricus then travelled into Persia, where he took the name of Manes and gave forth the doctrines of Buddas Terebinthus as his own. The king of Persia, hearing that he worked miracles, sent for him to heal his sick son, and on the child's dying put Manes in prison. Thence he escaped, flying into Mesopotamia, but was traced, captured, and flayed alive by the Persian king's orders, the skin being then stuffed with chaff and hung up before the gate of the city.

According to Jerome, Archelaus wrote his account of his disputation with "Manichæus" in Syriac, whence it was translated into Greek. The Greek is lost, and the work, apart from extracts, subsists only in a Latin translation from the Greek, of doubtful age and fidelity,   probably made after the 5th century. By Photius it is stated that Heraclean, bishop of Chalcedon, in his book against the Manichæans, said the  Disputation of Archelaus was written by one Hegemonius, an author not otherwise traceable, and of unknown date.

In the Latin narrative, "Manes" is said to have come, after his flight from court, from Arabion, a frontier fortress, to Caschar or Carchar, a town said to be in Roman Mesopotamia, in the hope of converting an eminent Christian there, named Marcellus, to whom he had sent a letter beginning: "Manichæus apostle of Jesus Christ, and all the saints and virgins with me, send peace to Marcellus." In his train he brought twenty-two (or twelve) youths and virgins.

At the request of Marcellus, he debated on religion with bishop Archelaus, by whom he was vanquished, whereupon he set out to return to Persia. On his way he proposed to debate with a priest at the town of Diodorides. But Archelaus came to take the priest's place, and again defeated him, whereupon, fearing to be given up to the Persians by the Christians, he returned to Arabion.

At this stage Archelaus introduces in a discourse to the people his history of "this Manes," very much to the effect of the recapitulation in Socrates. Among the further details are these: that Scythianus lived "in the time of the Apostles",  that Terebinthus said the name of Buddas had been imposed on him, that in the mountains he had been brought up by an angel, that he had been convicted of imposture by a Persian prophet named Parcus, and by Labdacus, son of Mithra.

Furthermore, that in the disputation he taught concerning the sphere, the two luminaries, the transmigration of souls, and the war of the Principia against God, that "Corbicius" or Corbicus, about the age of sixty, translated the books of Terebinthus.  He made three chief disciples, Thomas, Addas, and Hermas, of whom he sent the first to Egypt, and the second to Scythia, keeping the third with him. The two former returned when he was in prison, and that he sent them to procure for him the books of the Christians, which he then studied. According to the Latin narrative, finally, Manes on his return to Arabion was seized and taken to the Persian king, by whose orders he was flayed, his body being left to the birds, and his skin, filled with air, hung at the city gate.

Medieval Islamic accounts

Mani is described as a painter who set up a sectarian movement in opposition to Zoroastrianism. He was persecuted by Shapur I and fled to Central Asia, where he made disciples and embellished with paintings a Tchighil (or picturarum domus Chinensis) and another temple called Ghalbita. Provisioning in advance a cave which had a spring, he told his disciples he was going to heaven, and would not return for a year, after which time they were to seek him in the cave in question. They then came back there after a year and found him, whereupon he showed them an illustrated book, called Ergenk, or Estenk Arzhang, which he said he had brought from heaven.

Whereafter he had many followers, with whom he returned to Persia at the death of Shapur. The new king, Hormisdas, joined and protected the sect, and built Mani a castle. The next king, Bahram or Varanes, at first favoured Mani. After getting him to debate with certain Zoroastrian teachers, caused him to be flayed alive, and his skin to be stuffed and hung up. Thereupon most of his followers fled to India and China.

See also
 Mar Ammo
 Arzhang
 Cologne Mani-Codex The Gardens of Light Gospel of Mani
 Mandaeism

References

Sources

 Asmussen, Jes Peter, comp., Manichaean Literature: Representative Texts, Chiefly from Middle Persian and Parthian Writings, 1975, Scholars' Facsimiles & Reprints, .
Alexander Böhlig, 'Manichäismus' in: Theologische Realenzyklopädie 22 (1992),  25–45.
 
 Amin Maalouf, The Gardens of Light'' [Les Jardins de Lumière], translated from French by Dorothy S. Blair, 242 p. (Interlink Publishing Group, New York, 2007).

External links
 Manichaeist art - University of Washington
 "Mani and Manichaeism in the J.R.Ritman Library"
 The Book of the Giants by W.B. Henning, 1943
 Acta Archelai

Manichaeism
216 births
274 deaths
3rd-century Iranian people
3rd-century writers
Ancient occultists
Anti-natalists
Creators of writing systems
Founders of religions
Iranian painters
Iranian prophets
Iranian religious leaders
People executed by crucifixion
People executed by flaying
People executed by the Sasanian Empire
Writers of lost works
Year of birth uncertain
3rd-century religious leaders
3rd-century theologians
Ctesiphon